was Japanese botanist. He was a distinguished member of the Faculty of Science of Kyoto Imperial University. He is perhaps best known for his 1953 .

Species named after Ohwi 
 (Cyperaceae) Carex ohwii Masam.
 (Cyperaceae) Cyperus ohwii Kük.
 (Lamiaceae) Clerodendrum ohwii Kaneh. & Hatus.
 (Lamiaceae) Isodon × ohwii Okuyama
 (Lamiaceae) Rabdosia × ohwii (Okuyama), Hara
 (Melastomataceae)  Medinilla ohwii  Nayar.
 (Orchidaceae)  Epipactis ohwii  Fukuy.
 (Orchidaceae)  Lecanorchis ohwii  Masam.
 (Orchidaceae)  Oreorchis ohwii  Fukuy.
 (Poaceae)  Panicum ohwii 
 (Poaceae)  Sasa ohwii  Koidz.
 (Rosaceae)  Prunus ohwii  Kaneh. & Hatus.
 (Ruscaceae) Ophiopogon ohwii Okuyama
 (Saxifragaceae)  Saxifraga ohwii  Tatew.

References

External links 

 IPNI Author Details for Jisaburo Ohwi (1905–1977) from the International Plant Names Index

1905 births
1977 deaths
20th-century Japanese botanists
Academic staff of Kyoto University
Japanese taxonomists